Stepan Yuryevich Astafyev (born 27 January 1994) is a Kazakhstani professional racing cyclist, who most recently rode for UCI Continental team . He rode in the men's team time trial at the 2015 UCI Road World Championships.

Major results

2014
 6th Tour of Almaty
2015
 National Road Championships
1st  Under-23 time trial
3rd Road race
3rd Time trial
3rd Under-23 road race
2016
 1st Stage 2 Tour de Taiwan
 2nd Time trial, National Under-23 Road Championships
2017
 10th Overall Tour of Ukraine
1st Prologue
2018
 1st Grand Prix Side
 2nd Overall Sri Lanka T-Cup
1st Points classification
 2nd Overall Tour de Korea
 Asian Cycling Championships
5th Time trial
7th Road race
2019
 4th Overall Five Rings of Moscow
2021
 4th Time trial, National Road Championships

References

External links

 

1994 births
Living people
Kazakhstani male cyclists
20th-century Kazakhstani people
21st-century Kazakhstani people